The 29th International Istanbul Film Festival was a film festival held in Istanbul, Turkey, which ran from April 3 to 18, 2010. More than 200 films were screened in 23 categories at seven movie theatres including Atlas, Rüya, Beyoğlu, Sinepop, Pera Museum theaters in Beyoğlu, the Kadıköy theater in Kadıköy and the Nişantaşı CityLife Cinema (City's).

This edition of the Istanbul International Film Festival, which was founded in 1984 and is organized by the Istanbul Foundation for Culture and Arts (İKSV) and accredited by FIAPF, opened with a gala on April 2, 2010, presented by actress Ceyda Düvenci and actor Yetkin Dikinciler at the Lütfi Kırdar Congress Exhibition Hall, followed by a screening of Le Concert by Romanian-French director Radu Mihaileanu.

Awards

Lifetime Achievement Award
 Italian filmmaker Marco Bellocchio

Honorary Cinema Awards
 Turkish actor Kadir İnanır
 Turkish film editor Mevlüt Koçak
 Turkish director and actor Feyzi Tuna

International Golden Tulip Competition
 Golden Tulip (in memory of Şakir Eczacıbaşı): The Misfortunates directed by Felix Van Groeningen
 Special Jury Prize: Sandrine Kiberlain for Mademoiselle Chambon

National Golden Tulip Competition
 Golden Tulip Best Film Award: Vavien directed by Yağmur & Durul Taylan
 Best Director Award: Miraz Bezar for Min Dît: The Children of Diyarbakır ( / )
 Best Actress Award: Şenay Orak  for Min Dît: The Children of Diyarbakır  ( / )
 Best Actor Award: Tansu Biçer for Five Cities
 Best Screenplay Award: Engin Günaydın for Vavien
 Best Cinematography Award: Barış Özbiçer for Honey
 Best Music Award: Mustafa Biber  for Min Dît: The Children of Diyarbakır  ( / )
 Special Jury Prize: Honey directed by Semih Kaplanoğlu

The Council of Europe Film Awards
 Face Award: Ajami directed by Scandar Copti and Yaron Shani
 Special Jury Prize: The Day God Walked Away directed by Philippe Van Leeuw

International Film Critics Association (FIPRESCI) Prizes
 International Competition Prize: Mademoiselle Chambon directed by Stéphane Brizé
 National Competition Prize (in memory of Onat Kutlar): Vavien directed by Yağmur & Durul Taylan

People's Choice Awards
 International Competition Award: I Killed My Mother directed by Xavier Dolan
 National Competition Award: Honey directed by Semih Kaplanoğlu

National programmes

National competition
 Min Dît: The Children of Diyarbakır ( / ) directed by Miraz Bezar
 Brought by the Sea directed by Nesli Çölgeçen
 Envy directed by Zeki Demirkubuz
 Love, Bitter directed by A. Taner Elhan
 Jolly Life directed by Yılmaz Erdoğan
 In Darkness directed by Çağan Irmak
 A Step into the Darkness directed by Atıl İnaç
 Honey directed by Semih Kaplanoğlu
 Vavien directed by Yağmur & Durul Taylan
 The Voice directed by Ümit Ünal
 Five Cities directed by Onur Ünlü

See also 
 2010 in film
 Turkish films of 2010

External links
  for the festival

References

Istanbul International Film Festival
Istanbul International Film Festival
International Istanbul Film Festival 29th
2010 in Istanbul